"Mayday" (stylised in all caps) is a song by Japanese rock band Coldrain. It is the fifth single from their sixth studio album The Side Effects, produced by Michael Baskette, written by Masato Hayakawa and Ryo Yokochi, and was released on 2 November 2019. "Mayday" features Ryo Kinoshita from Japanese metalcore band Crystal Lake.

"Mayday" is the second anime opening for Fire Force. Due to the success of the single being on the anime, it started rotating in circles around the metalcore scene elevating the band to new heights. It would also eventually become the first song by the band to reach over 10 million streams on Spotify. As of 2022, "Mayday" has since been viewed and streamed more than 50 million times worldwide.

Background
"Mayday" was released on November 2, 2019 as the band's fifth single and opening track off their sixth studio album The Side Effects, following the release of the fourth single "The Side Effects" that was released back in August.

In July 2019, following the release of the second single "Coexist". The track list was released by the band and was revealed to have a feature by Ryo Kinoshita on the opening track "Mayday". At the end of the following month on August 26, it was announced that "Mayday" would be selected to be the second opening for the anime Fire Force. The guitarist and one of the main songwriters, Ryo Yokochi, would go on to explain the process and collaboration of working on "Mayday" for Fire Force:
"When we got to talk, we got asked for permission, and we were sympathetic to the information that Mr. Okubo often listens to loud music in the early 2000s, and because it was a thing with hope for offensive music, we tried to do it with all our best, the dark side of the original (Shin). I was allowed to create a song with the image of the serious and positive feelings of the members who fought with the past of La and the family of The Big, and such things, and I think that it was finished with a very heavy, cool, and lively feeling, this "Mayday feat. (Ryo from Crystal Lake)" I hope that the world of the work as an OP of the TV anime "Flame Fire Brigade" is added to the world view of the work of Coldrain."

Composition

"Mayday" is a metalcore, heavy metal, and a hard rock song. The track runs at 121 BPM and is in the key of A# minor. It runs for three minutes and 47 seconds. The song was written by Masato Hayakawa and Ryo Yokochi, it was produced by Michael Baskette, with featured vocals from Ryo Kinoshita.

The song's intro samples the Pakistan International Airlines Flight 661 mayday distress signal.

Song structure and writing
In an interview with Gekirock, Hayakawa would go on to explain the reason for the collaboration with Crystal Lake's, Ryo Kinoshita, on "Mayday" and the decision for having the song being the opening track on The Side Effects. 
"I just thought that it was a good fit for the first song, and I didn't think about doing a featured song that much. The part of the featured vocals early on seemed, "Oh, this part is not me, it's Ryo". Ryo told me to call him anytime at various times, so I had him come. I didn't even aim and make it, and I thought that the person I just left to rock was Ryo, so I asked him as it was. I think Ryo also had a fresh face. So, I rewrote it as much as possible and put it in the state of the raw voice that Ryo possesses. At first, he didn't like it, but he showed me the best part for him and for that, I think it became a very pleasant feature."

Critical reception
"Mayday" was an instant hit among fans and critics alike, receiving very positive reviews. Critics noted the impact of Ryo Kinoshita's guest vocals on the song. Suzuki Kayomi of Live Japan Music wrote: ""Mayday" opens the album featuring Crystal Lake singer Ryo Kinoshita, a partnership we had long known when Masato Hayakawa appeared on the single "The Circle". The song didn't let us down, it was the perfect balance of the band's typical chords and Ryo's vocal range." Severin Furer of Morecore would go on to say something similar to say, though would also talk about the insane catchy infectious chorus. ""Mayday" greets us with a catchy chorus and the strong vocals of the aforementioned Ryo during the bridge."

Accolades
In 2019, the song was labelled as one of the "Top 25 Anime Opening and Endings of 2019" by J-Rock News. In 2022, Comic Book Resources named "Mayday" as the sixth best anime song to "add to your workout playlist."

Music video
The music video was premiered on November 2, 2019. The music video is directed by Inni Vision, with footage of the band captured performing "Mayday" on their One Man Tour in Japan. The video features Ryo Kinoshita as a special guest who performs the song alongside the band.

The video was the fastest music video by the band to reach 1 million views, just a little over two months after its release in January 2020. It has since still been the fastest-growing music video released by the band, overtaking every single video released in The Side Effects era in quick succession.

In July 2021, the song reached 5 million views on YouTube. This would become the third song by the band to reach this milestone on the platform, which only "Gone" and "Die Tomorrow" had previously achieved. Not long after, it became the second most viewed music video by the band, surpassing "Gone". In late November, "Mayday" overtook "Die Tomorrow" to become the most viewed song by the band on the site.

As of November 2022, the music video for "Mayday" has over 7 million views on YouTube.

Track listing

Personnel
Credits adapted from Tidal.

Coldrain

 Masato Hayakawa – lead vocals, lyrics
 Ryo Yokochi – lead guitar, programming, composition
 Kazuya Sugiyama – rhythm guitar
 Ryo Shimizu – bass guitar
 Katsuma Minatani – drums

Additional personnel
 Ryo Kinoshita – vocals
 Michael Baskette – producer, mixing, arrangements
 Ted Jensen – mastering
 Jeff Moll – recording engineer
 Joshua Saldate – assistant engineer

Charts

References

Coldrain songs
2019 songs
Warner Music Group singles
Song recordings produced by Michael Baskette
Songs written by Masato Hayakawa
Metalcore songs
Japanese hard rock songs
Anime songs